Andrew Edward Kostecka (February 10, 1921 – January 17, 2007) was an American professional basketball player. Kostecka was selected in the 1948 BAA draft by the Indianapolis Jets after a collegiate career at Georgetown. He played for the Jets for one season before retiring from basketball.

In his post-basketball career, Kostecka worked for the Central Intelligence Agency (CIA) and Department of Commerce. Kostecka was also in the United States Army, and during World War II he "served as General Douglas MacArthur's Russian interpreter and was among the first group of Americans to enter Nagasaki after the explosion of the atomic bomb over the city." He became a 1st Lieutenant.

He is buried in Arlington National Cemetery. His grandson Andrew Kostecka III played for Loyola (Maryland) and currently in Israel.

BAA career statistics

Regular season

References

External links

 Georgetown Basketball History: The Top 100 → 25. Andy Kostecka

1921 births
2007 deaths
United States Army personnel of World War II
American men's basketball players
Basketball players from Newark, New Jersey
Bloomfield High School (New Jersey) alumni
Burials at Arlington National Cemetery
Forwards (basketball)
Georgetown Hoyas men's basketball players
Indianapolis Jets draft picks
Indianapolis Jets players
People from Bloomfield, New Jersey
People of the Central Intelligence Agency
United States Army officers
Military personnel from New Jersey